TSS (RMS) Manx Maid (I) No. 131765 - the first ship in the Company's history to be so named - was a packet steamer which was bought by the Isle of Man Steam Packet Company from the London and Southwestern Railway Company, and commenced service with the Steam Packet in 1923.

Dimensions

Constructed for the London and Southwestern Railway Company and named Caesarea, the vessel was built by Cammell Laird at Birkenhead in 1910. Length 284'6"; beam 39'1"; depth 15'8".
Caesarea was launched at Birkenhead on Wednesday 14 September 1910.

Powered by three directly coupled turbines, and producing 6,500 i.h.p., Caesarea's boilers were double-ended circular return type, with a working steam pressure of 160 pounds p.s.i. This gave Caesarea a service speed of 20 knots.

Service life

London and Southwestern Railway Company

Caesarea entered service with the London and Southwestern Railway Company in 1910, who employed her on the Southampton - Channel Islands service.

On 7 July 1923, in a thick fog, Caesarea struck a rock off Corbière as she was making passage from Jersey. Water began to enter the stokehold and engine room, whilst the stern began to fill, leading to the ship beginning to founder. She was able to turn round and almost made it back to St Helier Harbour, but sank just outside the pierheads. Caesarea was stuck fast for almost two weeks, but was refloated on 20 July on a spring tide. Nobody was injured. Following her salvage, Caesarea was taken under tow to Southampton for initial repair, and from there to Birkenhead at where her repairs were completed and she was acquired by the Isle of Man Steam Packet Company.

Isle of Man Steam Packet Company
Purchased by the Isle of Man Steam Packet Company in December 1923 for an initial price of £9,000 and renamed Manx Maid, she was refitted at a cost of £22,500 and converted to oil burning for a further £7,000 resulting in a total cost to the Company of £38,500.

Manx Maid was fired by six furnaces for each boiler and at 18 knots would consume 84 tons of oil in 24 hours - or 36 tons at 12 knots.

Manx Maid entered service with the Steam Packet fleet in time for the 1924 tourist season. She was employed operating to the numerous destinations then served by the Company, and continued to give reliable service to and from the Island, until with the dark clouds of war beginning to gather, she was requisitioned by the Admiralty on 27 August 1939, as an ABV - an armoured boarding vessel.

War service
Manx Maid saw service in both World Wars. In 1914, she was requisitioned and served throughout the World War I under her original name, Caesarea.

In World War II she was requisitioned in August 1939, and served as an ABV, an Armed Boarding Vessel.

As other Steam Packet ships were attending the Evacuation of Dunkirk, Manx Maid took no part in Operation Dynamo, as she was undergoing repairs at the time. However, once her repairs were completed, she was ordered to Southampton and made two crossings into the war zone as the retreat moved westwards along the French coast. Her first mission took her to St Malo, but by the time she arrived the port was already under German occupation. She escaped after being unable to go inshore, and returned to England.

She then made passage to Brest, and in one trip brought out nearly 3,000 troops, roughly twice her allowable passenger complement. Manx Maid was almost two feet below her marks, and consequently developed condenser trouble meaning she had to heave to for nearly three hours some distance off the French Coast with the main enemy force approximately 30 miles from the port. Even so, she finally reached Plymouth safely.

In October 1941 she became a 'Special Duties' vessel and was renamed H.M.S. Bruce by the Royal Navy. From the end of March 1942 she became a Fleet Air Arm target vessel, continuing those duties until March, 1945.

She was paid off at Ardrossan on 21 March 1945 (minus her mainmast), and returned to the Isle of Man Steam Packet Company that day.

Post-war service and disposal
Following her war service, Manx Maid returned to the Isle of Man.

Manx Maid was towed to Barrow-in-Furness for breaking up in November 1950.

Gallery

References

Bibliography
 

Ships of the Isle of Man Steam Packet Company
1910 ships
World War I merchant ships of the United Kingdom
World War II merchant ships of the Isle of Man
Ferries of the Isle of Man
Steamships of the United Kingdom
Maritime incidents in 1923
Steamships
Merchant ships of the United Kingdom
World War II merchant ships of the United Kingdom
Ships built on the River Mersey